Andriy Bulkovskyi or Andrii Bulkovskyi (ukr. Андрій Булковський) is a Ukrainian Olympic middle-distance runner. He represented his country in the men's 1500 meters at the 1996 Summer Olympics. His time was a 3:53.30.

References

1972 births
Living people
Ukrainian male middle-distance runners
Olympic athletes of Ukraine
Athletes (track and field) at the 1996 Summer Olympics